Several naval ships of Germany were named Cöln or Köln after the city of Cologne, Germany:

  (1911–1914), a 
  (1918–1919), a 
  (1930–1945), a 
  (1961–1982), a F120 
  (1984–2012), a F122 
 German corvette Köln (F265), a Braunschweig-class corvette

See also
 
 

German Navy ship names
Ship names